Kenza Farah (born 8 July 1986) is a Franco-Algerian singer-songwriter. Her album Authentik won gold in its second week. It was followed up by Avec le cœur and Trésor.

Career
Kenza Farah was born on 8 July 1986 in Béjaïa, Algeria and grew up in the 15th arrondissement of Marseille. She has six siblings. At the age of 14, she began playing shows in neighborhoods and won singing contests. Followed by a singing competition, Farah met the producers who allowed her to record some songs in the studio, including "Mon Ange", "Trésor" and "Il ma trahie". She was noticed by the producer Abdel.B, who produced her album from 2006 to 2007 with the independent record label Karismatik.

She is known for her collaborations with many artists such as Sefyu, Le Rat Luciano, Idir, Big Ali, Psy 4 de la Rime, Nina Sky, Roldán of the group Orishas, Busy Signal, Alonzo, Melissa M, Kayline and Nabila (of Karismatik), Soprano, and Ahmed Chawki amongst others.

Discography

Albums

Singles

Featured in

Mixtapes

References

External links
Official Site
Kenza Farah's blog

1986 births
Living people
French people of Berber descent
Algerian emigrants to France
French women singers
French women rappers
Hip hop singers
Kabyle people
French rhythm and blues singers
Soul singers
Women hip hop musicians
People from Béjaïa
Algerian expatriates in France
French people of Kabyle descent
Women hip hop singers